Arestorides is a genus of sea snails, marine gastropod mollusks in the family Cypraeidae, the cowries.

Species
Species within the genus Arestorides include:
Arestorides argus (Linnaeus, 1758)

References

Cypraeidae